The Fall of the Towers is a trilogy of science fantasy books by American writer Samuel R. Delany.

First published in omnibus form in 1970, the trilogy was originally published individually as Captives of the Flame (1963, rewritten as Out of the Dead City in 1968), The Towers of Toron (1964), and City of a Thousand Suns (1965). The first two books were somewhat rewritten for the  omnibus edition. Delany describes the extent of the rewriting in a final note in the one-volume text.

The stories of the Fall of the Towers trilogy were originally set in the same post-holocaust Earth as Delany's earlier The Jewels of Aptor; however, linking references were removed in later revised editions.

Contents
 Notes on Revision - essay by Samuel R. Delany 
 Prologue - essay by Samuel R. Delany 
 Out of the Dead City (1966) (aka Captives of the Flame, 1963) 
 The Towers of Toron (1964)
 City of a Thousand Suns (1965)
 Epilogue (1964) - essay by Samuel R. Delany
 Afterword (1964) - essay by Samuel R. Delany

References

Sources

External links
 

Novels by Samuel Delany
American science fiction novels
American fantasy novels
Books with cover art by Frank Kelly Freas
Ace Books books